The Immediate Geographic Region of Campo Belo is one of the 10 immediate geographic regions in the Intermediate Geographic Region of Varginha, one of the 70 immediate geographic regions in the Brazilian state of Minas Gerais and one of the 509 of Brazil, created by the National Institute of Geography and Statistics (IBGE) in 2017.

Municipalities 
It comprises 5 municipalities.

 Aguanil      
 Campo Belo      
 Candeias      
 Cristais      
 Santana do Jacaré

References 

Geography of Minas Gerais